The Pan American Masters Games or Americas Masters Games is a regional multi-sport event which involves participants from the Americas region. Governed by the International Masters Games Association (IMGA), the Americas Masters Games is open to participants of all abilities and most ages – the minimum age criterion is 30 years. Participants compete for themselves, instead of their countries. There are no competition qualification requirements apart from the age requirement and membership in that sport's governing body. The event's first edition was hosted by Vancouver, Canada from 26 August to 4 September 2016.

History 

2020 was postponed and later cancelled.

See also 
 South American Games
 World Masters Games
 Asia Pacific Masters Games
 European Masters Games

References

Masters Games
Games